Åmåls Blues Fest is a blues festival in Åmål, Sweden.  The festival is usually held in July. It started in 1992.

References
 Åmåls Bluesförening

Music festivals in Sweden